The Foton Tunland is a budget compact pickup sold by the Chinese manufacturer Foton Motor sold in China since November 2011 as well as Australia, Colombia and emerging markets.

Overview
To help manufacture the Tunland, joint venture agreements were signed between Foton and established brands, including Cummins diesel engines, Getrag transmission, a Borg Warner transfer case and Dana axles and differentials in the 4x4 (the 2 Wheel drive has a Tangshan 5 speed transmission), Bosch electronics and ABS.

2018 Facelift

The facelift was released in China at the 2018 Beijing Auto Show. The new 2018 Tunland facelift is available in both standard and extended versions. The body dimensions are 5310×1880×1860mm and 5603×1880×1860mm, with the wheelbases of 3105mm and 3398mm, respectively.

Tunland Shengtu 5 and Shengtu 7 (2019)
The Tunland Shengtu 5 and Shengtu 7 are updated variants of the Tunland that were launched in December 2019 alongside the Tunland Yutu pickups. The Shengtu 5 and Shengtu 7 variants are available with a 2.0 liter turbo diesel engine, and have a maximum output of 163 (120kW) and 390N·m mated to a 6-speed manual transmission.

Sales

References

Foton Motor vehicles
2010s cars
Pickup trucks
All-wheel-drive vehicles
Cars of China
Cars introduced in 2011